On the Boardwalk with Paul Whiteman is an American talent show that aired live on ABC on Sunday night from May 30, 1954, to August 1, 1954, hosted by Paul Whiteman.

Overview
Telecast live from the Steel Pier in Atlantic City, New Jersey, the program featured eight young performers during the first half hour who were then rated by a panel of four show business people. The four performers who ranked highest would then return the following week to perform again after having a week of professional coaching.

References

1954 American television series debuts
1954 American television series endings
American Broadcasting Company original programming
American live television series
Television shows set in New Jersey